Tlaquiltenango is a city in the Mexican state of Morelos.

The city serves as the municipal seat for the surrounding municipality, with which it shares a name. The toponym Tlaquiltenango comes from a Nahuatl name and means "place of whitewashed walls". 
The municipality reported 33,844 inhabitants in the year 2015 census.

History

Prehispanic history
There are two pre-Hispanic archaeological sites in Tlaquiltenango: Chimalacatlan and Huaxtla. Chamalacatlan was built on the top of the hill of "El Venado"; it had 33 terraces and an equal number of piles of cut stone. There is also a small cave that was used for ceremonies. From the top of the hill, you can see Lake Tequesquitengo, Xochicalco, and parts of the state of Guerrero. The site is almost unique among Mesoamerican ruins in that the walls and platform were constructed of megaliths rather than the smaller rocks usually found in such structures. A small ceremonial ballcourt is also uncharacteristic of the Olmecs. The ruins were described by Fernando de Alva Ixtlixochitl in the early 17th century, although the modern discovery by Father Lorenzo Castro in the late 19th century was more significant. Castro reported his find to Bishop Francisco Plancarte y Navarrete, who speculated Chimalacatlan was none other than the mythological Tamoanchan, the cradle of Mesoamerican civilization.
 
Huaxtla was built in what is the center of the community by that name today, at the top of a horseshoe-shaped hill. The ruins are similar to those of Chimalacatlan. It is believed that the inhabitants of these sites were from Tepexpan, who migrated south in search of better food and a better climate.

Conquest and colonialism
Tlaquiltenango was included in the towns belonging to the marquisate of the Valley of Oaxtepec, awarded to the conquistador Hernán Cortés.

The convent-fortress Santo Domingo de Guzmán was initiated by the order of the Franciscans and finished by the Dominicans in the year 1540, one the oldest of the American continent. The convent is not very well-maintained, and there are cracks in the walls, and interior frescos are in poor condition. The clock was installed in December, 1898. In 1909, Mauricio de la Arena and Father Agapito Mateo Menes discovered a prehispanic codex in one corner; this is at the National Museum of Anthropology today.

Independence period
Tlaquiltenango became a city of the State of Mexico in 1825 under the 1824 Constitution of Mexico. It included not only present-day Tlaquiltenango, but also the municipalities of Jojutla and Zacatepec, and stretched southeast to the Cuautla River. It became a municipality of Morelos by decree of governor Carlos Pacheco on September 25, 1884.

The 2017 earthquake did considerable damage in Tlaquitenango. Two children and two women were killed, while a woman from Valle de Vázquez was killed in Jojutla. The earthquake left a large crack in the earth that split two houses apart and destroyed 183 others and severely damaged 365 other homes in Colonia Celino Manzanares next to the Yautepec River. The 16th-century church was severely damaged, as was the 17th-century bridge in Colonia Manzares, 60 stone fences collapsed, and the municipal hall was damaged. The Secreatary of Health reported that 396 homes were destroyed and 510 were damaged.

Jorge Maldonado Ortiz of Juntos Haremos Historia (Morena Together we will make history coalition) was elected Presidente Municipal (mayor) on July 1, 2018. José Almanza Alcaine, a former alderman and the 2018 candidate of Movimiento Ciudadano for municipal president, was gunned down on January 27, 2019. His two companions were also shot, and one died.

In response to the COVID-19 pandemic in Mexico, Tlaquiltenango blocked the entrances to the community. The town reports two confirmed cases and one death as of April 27, 2020. Schools and many businesses were closed from mid March until June 1. On July 2, Tlaquiltenango reported eleven infections and one death from the virus; the reopening of the state was pushed back until at least June 13. Tlaqiltenango reported 75 cases, 51 recuperations, and 22 deaths from the virus as of August 31. One hundred twenty/one cases were reported on December 27, 2020.

Communities
There are 29 communities in the municipality, which has a population of 29,637, including 292 people who identify as Indigenous. 16% of the 7,641 homes have a dirt floor, 89% have running water, 95% have electricity, 90% have television, and 11% have computers. The average education level is 7 years. Women have a fertility rate of 2.58 children. 12.61% of the population come from outside the state of Morelos. 67.7% are Roman Catholic, and 49.7% of the adults are economically active.

Tlaquiltenango is the municipal seat.

There is a prehispanic archaeological site in the community.

The 16th-century mining hacienda San Jacinto Ixtoluca houses a small hotel.

It has one preschool, one elementary school (grades 1–6), and one middle school (grades 7–9). Chimalacatlan is best known for its prehispanic archaeological site of the same name.

Culture

Points of Interest
The 16th-century church and monastery of Santo Domingo, the haciendas of Las Bóvedas and Los Hornos, and the concrete tower in El Rollo waterpark are the main historical constructions.

There are two waterparks in the municipality. El Rollo is located in Gabriel Tepepa and is one of the best waterparks in Latin America. It has 40 pools and 18 water slides, including one with a  height. Paraiso Aventura Las Huertas is a natural waterpark with a spring, camping area, cabins, picnic area, and pools.

The Museo Comunitario Rubén Jaramillo (Ruben Jaramillo Community Museum) in Tlaquiltenango is a small museum where paintings of revolutionary characters are exhibited, as well as books from the era of the Mexican Revolution, as well as pieces and pre-Hispanic tools. Rubén Jaramillo (1900-1962) was a native of Tlaquiltenango and a peasant and labor leader during the 1940s and 1950s who, along with his family, was assassinated by the Mexican Army in 1962.

The Santo Domingo Tlaquitenango bridge in Colonia Celerino Manzanares is a narrow, stone arched bridge designed by Fray Andrés de San Miguel in 1615. It was designed to open a path for miners from Cuautla de Amilpas en route to modern Guerrero and possibly as an alternative route to the hacienda of Huatecalco.

Church and monastery of Santo Domingo
Construction of the church and former monastery of Santo Domingo was begun by the Franciscans between 1535 and 1540, and it was completed by the Dominicans. It is considered one of the most beautiful 16th-century monasteries in Morelos.

The church is very large and rectangular. The main entrance is on the west side, and there is a side entrance on the south that is very similar to that of the Cuernavaca Cathedral. The nave and presbytery are separated by a triumphal arch supported by large, circular The columns. The western entrance to the church is simple and austere; above the access arch there is a stone triangle with a small window. There is a clock that was added in 1898 above the window.

The base of the bell tower is connected to the main façade of the church. It is proportionately tall and consists of two ornamented sections for bells that contrast with the general austerity of the church itself.

There are large pink, stone buttresses on the south side of the church and a carved, Franciscan-style cross above the main entrance. The interior of the church is simple in the Dominican style. The monastery cloister is high with a small central patio; the cells for the monks are simple. The atrium is huge; the capillas pozas for the instruction of unbaptized Indigenous and the two large entrances are still standing.

There is little information about earthquake damages prior to the 20th century. In 1957, the sphere at the top of the bell tower fell. The August 28, 1973 earthquake cracked several walls and left two walls off balance. The earthquakes of 1985, 1999, and September 7, 2017, did not cause serious damage to the building, but the September 19, 2017 earthquake did. The bell tower was almost completely separated from the main building, and the cupola was completely destroyed. Other damages were so severe that it is possible the building will no longer be used as a church.

Fiestas, dances, and traditions
Candlemas Day is celebrated on February 2 in Tlaquiltenango. There is a fair, jaripeo (bulls), and Chinelo and Tecuanes dances. In the latter, dancers wear old clothes, a mask, and a hat while they carry a dissected animal.

Tlayehualco celebrates the appearance of the Our Lady of Guadalupe on December 12.

Cuisine
White pork pozole, chito, goat and pork barbecue, fish in mixiote, in tamales and in clemole seasoned with wild plum and tamarind are typical foods in the area.

Geography

Location and area

To the north are the municipalities of Tlaltizapán, Ayala and Tepalcingo; to the south are the States of Guerrero and Puebla; to the west are the municipalities of Zacatepec, Jojutla, and Puente de Ixtla; while Tepalcingo is to the east.

Climate
The wet season in Tlaquiltenango (late May to late October) is overcast, the dry season (late October to late May) is partly cloudy, and it is hot year round. The hot season lasts for two months, from March 21 to May 23, with an average daily high temperature above  The cool season lasts for seven months, from June 25 to February 1, with an average daily high temperature below .

February 24, is the clearest day of the year, and September 14, is the cloudiest day of the year. The wind is mostly from the west in March, from the south from April through June, and from the east from July through February.

Relief and water resources
Dominant heights in the municipality of Tlaquiltenango are the Santa María hill, the Guajolote hill, the Huautla hill, the Palo Verde hill, the black ground of the Ciénega, and the Limón. Along the boundaries of the State of Puebla and Municipality of Tepalcingo, are Tetillas, Cerro Picacho del Burial, Temazcales, and Cueva (Cave) de San Martín. Hilly areas cover 44% of Tlaquiltenango, mostly in the center and south. 38% of the land is semi-flat, mostly in the center and south. Plains cover 18% of the total surface, mostly in the northwest.

Water resources in Tlaquiltenango include the Amacuzac River, which flows from west to south; the Cuautla River, which flows from north to south joining the Amacuzac River west of Nexpa, and the Yautepec River. This last flows northwest, joining the Apatlaco River in Jojutla. There are also smaller, intermittent channels that descend from the mountains during the rainy season. In addition, there are springs in El Rollo, Nexpa, Los Elotes, Valle de Vázquez, and La Huertas. Finally, there are 25 wells—21 for drinking water and four used for irrigation.

Flora and fauna
Flora consists mainly of low deciduous forests in a warm climate. Jacaranda, tabachín, Ipomoea arborescens (the morning glory tree or casahuate, a medium-sized tree with white flowers), ceiba (a very large grayish-green tree with pink or white flowers that provide fruit), and bougainvillea. Wild animals include white-tailed deer, boar of collar, raccoon, badger, skunk, armadillo, hare, common rabbit, coyote, wildcat, weasel, cacomixtle, tlacuache (a member of the raccoon family), and bats, flagged bird, chachalaca (a very noisy bird), magpie copetona, vulture, aura (buzzard), crow, owl, and songbirds and ornamental birds.

Sierra de Huautla

There is a broad range of ecosystem, including low deciduous forest, gallery vegetation, and pine and oak forests. 939 species of plants, 44 species of butterflies, 71 species of mammals, 208 species of birds, 53 species of reptiles, 18 species of amphibians, and 14 species of fish have been noted. Among the species of animals are jaguars, short-horned Baronia butterfly, beaded lizard, military macaw, rufous-backed robin, Balsas screech owl, Pileated flycatcher, mountain lion, ocelot, margay, bobcat, and jaguarundi.

Natural resources and land tenure
Rivers and land are the most important natural resources in Tlaquiltenango. Sugarcane, rice, onions, sorghum, tomatoes, corn, and beans are the most important crops. Cattle, pigs, goats, sheep, horses, and poultry are raised.

Land tenure can be divided into  of ejidal property and  private property.

See also
 List of people from Morelos, Mexico

References

External links
http://www.e-tlaquiltenango.gob.mx/
http://e-municipios.e-morelos.gob.mx/tlaquiltenango.htm

Municipalities of Morelos
Populated places in Morelos
Nahua settlements